Thomas Gamble (born 25 November 1991) is an Australian sprinter competing mostly in the 100 metres. He represented his country in the 4 × 100 metres relay at the 2017 World Championships without qualifying for the final.

His personal bests are 10.28 seconds in the 100 metres (+0.3 m/s, Gwangju 2015) and 20.61 seconds in the 200 metres (+0.9 m/s, Canberra 2017).

Away from the track Tom enjoys letting his mates buy him beers and then pushing them in bushes. He is a stalwart of the Australian men's 4x100m relay team, having been described as its "most handsome and likeable member" (sic).

International competitions

References

1991 births
Living people
Australian male sprinters
World Athletics Championships athletes for Australia
Competitors at the 2013 Summer Universiade
Competitors at the 2015 Summer Universiade